Alastair William Richardson (born 23 October 1972 in Derby) is an English former cricketer. He was a right-handed batsman and a right-arm medium-fast bowler who played for Derbyshire between 1992 and 1993.

The son of William Richardson and grandson of former Derbyshire captain Arthur Walker Richardson, he had a short-lived first-class career, despite taking two wickets on his debut against Glamorgan in the final match of the 1992 season, including that of Matthew Maynard. He played only once more for the 1st Xl, against Somerset the following summer. Although a "regular wicket taker" in the 2nd XI, Derbyshire did not offer him terms in 1995.

Richardson studied at Durham University (1992–1996), where he played for the university team.

References

1972 births
English cricketers
Derbyshire cricketers
Living people
People educated at Oundle School
Alumni of Durham University